Round About Hills or Peacefields is a historic slave plantation home located at Glenwood, Howard County, Maryland. An alternate address for this house is 14581 McClintock Drive, Glenwood, Maryland.  It was built about 1773 on a 266-acre land patent and consists of a -story frame house with a stone end. Thomas Beale Dorsey inherited the property in 1794 then exchanged his interest in the plantation with Thomas Cook's stagecoach wayside town Cooksville.

The main block is three bays wide by one bay deep, with a gambrel roof and 1-story hip-roofed porch.  It features a long screened porch with exposed rafter tails and an 1820 stone kitchen addition.  Also on the property is a stone slave quarters outbuilding and a small frame outbuilding.

It was listed on the National Register of Historic Places in 2008.

See also
List of Howard County properties in the Maryland Historical Trust
Roxbury Mill

References

External links
 at Maryland Historical Trust

Glenwood, Howard County, Maryland
Houses on the National Register of Historic Places in Maryland
Houses completed in 1773
Howard County, Maryland landmarks
Houses in Howard County, Maryland
National Register of Historic Places in Howard County, Maryland
Slave cabins and quarters in the United States